Gregg Schroeder (born July 2, 1980 in Long Beach, California) is an American soccer player, currently playing for Southern California Seahorses in the USL Premier Development League.

Career

College and Amateur
Schroeder played college soccer at Westmont College, where he earned Region II and All-Conference Honors, and was the team's defensive MVP as a senior. During his college years he also spent four years playing with the Southern California Seahorses in the USL Premier Development League.

Professional
Undrafted out of college, Schroeder briefly played in Sweden with Ytterby IS and in India with the Madras Eagles, before signing with the Charlotte Eagles in the USL Second Division in 2006. He made his professional debut on April 21, 2006, in Charlotte's 2006 season opener against Cincinnati Kings. He was named to the 2006 USL-2 Second Team, was a 2006 USL-2 Rookie of the Year Finalist. He was a mainstay in the Eagles squad until suffering a serious knee injury towards the end of the 2008 season.

He was released by the Eagles at the end of the 2009 season, and returned to lead the Southern California Seahorses in their 2010 USL Premier Development League campaign.

References

External links
 Charlotte Eagles bio

Living people
1980 births
Charlotte Eagles players
Southern California Seahorses players
USL Second Division players
USL League Two players
Association football midfielders
American soccer players